Lake Thun is an Alpine lake in the Bernese Oberland in Switzerland named after the city of Thun, on its northern shore. At  in surface area, it is the largest Swiss lake entirely within a single canton.

The lake was created after the last glacial period. After the 10th century, it split from Lake Brienz, before which the two lakes were combined, as Wendelsee ("Lake Wendel").

Lake Thun's approximate  catchment area frequently causes local flooding after heavy rainfalls. This occurs because the river Aare, which drains Lake Thun, has only limited capacity to handle the excess runoff. The lake is fed by water from Lake Brienz to the southeast, which is  higher than Lake Thun, and various streams in the Oberland, including the Kander.

In 1835, passenger steamships began operating regularly on the lake. Ten passenger ships, operated by the local railway company BLS AG like , serve the towns of Interlaken and Thun; the Interlaken ship canal and Thun ship canal connect the lake to Interlaken West railway station and Thun railway station respectively.

Following World War II and up until 1964, the Swiss Government disposed of unused munitions into Lake Thun.  The quantity of munitions dumped is reported to be from 3,000 to more than 9,020 tons.

References

External links

 Lake Thun Tourism Portal
 The River Aare sluices

 
Thun
Thun
Bernese Oberland
LThun
Thun
Lakes of the Alps